The men's 200 metres event at the 2019 European Athletics U23 Championships was held in Gävle, Sweden, at Gavlehov Stadium Park on 12 and 13 July.

Medalists

Results

Heats
12 July
Qualification: First 4 in each heat (Q) and next 4 fastest (q) qualified for the semifinals.

Wind:Heat 1: +0.4 m/s, Heat 2: +1.1 m/s, Heat 3: +1.1 m/s, Heat 4: +1.2 m/s, Heat 5: +0.8 m/s

Semifinals
13 July
Qualification: First 2 in each heat (Q) and next 2 fastest (q) qualified for the final.

Wind:Heat 1: -1.2 m/s, Heat 2: -1.2 m/s, Heat 3: +1.3 m/s

Final
13 July

Wind: -0.1 m/s

References

200
200 metres at the European Athletics U23 Championships